H-IIA (H-2A) is an active expendable launch system operated by Mitsubishi Heavy Industries (MHI) for the Japan Aerospace Exploration Agency. These liquid fuel rockets have been used to launch satellites into geostationary orbit; lunar orbiting spacecraft; Akatsuki, which studied the planet Venus; and the Emirates Mars Mission, which was launched to Mars in July 2020. Launches occur at the Tanegashima Space Center. The H-IIA first flew in 2001. , H-IIA rockets were launched 45 times, including 39 consecutive missions without a failure, dating back to 29 November 2003.

Production and management of the H-IIA shifted from JAXA to MHI on 1 April 2007. Flight 13, which launched the lunar orbiter SELENE, was the first H-IIA launched after this privatization.

The H-IIA is a derivative of the earlier H-II rocket, substantially redesigned to improve reliability and minimize costs. There have been four variants, with two in active service (as of 2020) for various purposes. A derivative design, the H-IIB, was developed in the 2000s and made its maiden flight in 2009.

Vehicle description 
The launch capability of an H-IIA launch vehicle can be enhanced by adding SRB-A solid rocket booster (SRB) and Castor 4AXL solid strap-on booster (SSB) to its basic configuration. The models are indicated by three or four numbers following the prefix "H2A":
 The first number in the sequence indicates the number of stages
 The second, the number of liquid rocket boosters (LRBs)
 The third, the number of SRBs
 An optional fourth number shows the number of SSBs.
The first two figures are virtually fixed at "20", as H-IIA is always two-staged, and the plans for LRBs were cancelled and superseded by the H-IIB.

Variants 
Launch system status

Launch history 

The first H-IIA was successfully launched on 29 August 2001, followed by a string of successes.

The sixth launch on 29 November 2003, intended to launch two IGS reconnaissance satellites, failed. JAXA announced that launches would resume in 2005, and the first successful flight took place on 26 February 2005 with the launch of MTSAT-1R.

The first launch for a mission beyond Earth orbit was on 14 September 2007 for the SELENE Moon mission. The first foreign payload on the H-IIA was the Australian FedSat-1 in 2002. As of March 2015, 27 out of 28 launches were successful.

A rocket with increased launch capabilities, H-IIB, is a derivative of the H-IIA family. H-IIB uses two LE-7A engines in its first stage, as opposed to one in H-IIA. The first H-IIB was successfully launched on 10 September 2009.

For the 29th flight on 24 November 2015, an H-IIA with an upgraded second stage launched the Telstar 12V satellite, the first commercial primary payload for a Japanese launch vehicle.

See also 

 Comparison of orbital launchers families
 Comparison of orbital launch systems

References 
Notes

Sources

External links 

 H-IIA LAUNCH SERVICES , Mitsubishi Heavy Industries
 JAXA H-IIA English page
 JAXA English page
 JAXA Launch Schedule 
 Tanegashima Space Center 
 "Tanegashima Space Center"– VISIT JAXA --
 Encyclopedia Astronautica page
 Failed Launch, 11-29-2003
 Image
 Launch 2 Image

Expendable space launch systems
Mitsubishi Heavy Industries space launch vehicles
Vehicles introduced in 2001

de:H-II#H-IIA